Hard II Love is the eighth studio album by American singer-songwriter Usher. It was released on September 16, 2016, by RCA Records. Recording sessions took place between from 2013 to 2016, including the executive production from Usher, alongside Mark Pitts, Jaha Johnson, and its co-production by Coup D'état. It features contribution for its album's production by Brandon "B.A.M." Hodge, Rock City, Pop & Oak, PartyNextDoor, D'Mile, Tricky Stewart, The-Dream, Metro Boomin and Raphael Saadiq, among others. The album was supported by four singles: "No Limit" featuring Young Thug, "Crash", "Missin U" and "Rivals" featuring Future.

The album was available for online streaming on June 13, 2016, exclusively through the streaming service Tidal, which Usher co-owns. On June 16, 2016, it was released for paid purchase on other digital download and online streaming services on September 16, 2016. The album debuted at number five on the US Billboard 200, earning 38,000 album-equivalent units in its first week.

Background 
In an interview with Rap-Up, singer-songwriter Eric Bellinger explained that himself, along with Jermaine Dupri, Bryan-Michael Cox and Brian Alexander Morgan, were working on Usher's next album. Bellinger compared the album's music to Usher's Confessions, saying that it is "more urban" than Looking 4 Myself. The latter declared that his next album would show that he is "still Usher". In an interview with Billboard, Bellinger explained that Usher created music for his previous albums based on what people wanted to hear. For his follow-up project, he chose to do music based on "what he wants to do in his heart", placing R&B as the album's main focus.

On January 6, 2014, RCA Records CEO Peter Edge described Usher's album as "one of his best records," and stated that new music from the record would be released in conjunction with his return on the sixth season of The Voice, on February 24. The album would feature several guest appearances and contributions from Nicki Minaj, Pop & Oak, Steve Mostyn of Public School, Pharrell Williams, Jermaine Dupri, Diplo, Ed Sheeran, Skrillex, Drake and Chris Brown. Usher teamed up with Honey Nut Cheerios in a conjoint promotional effort, where the singer is shown dancing to the album's second single "She Came to Give It to You" with the Honey Nut Cheerios bee. During the outset of the commercial, the album's title was rumored to be UR, the singer's initials.

On September 8, 2014, Usher told Billboard, that the album would be indefinitely delayed, though wouldn't divulge further details due to the album not being finished; it was to be originally released in September 2014. On January 14, 2016, after continual delays of his eighth album, Usher announced via Instagram that the official title of the album would be titled Flawed. In August 2016, an iTunes New Zealand link popped up with a new Usher album, along with the title and cover art of the album being called Hard II Love. He then confirmed the title on the late-night talk show Jimmy Kimmel Live!.

Cover artwork 
The album's cover art is a portrait sculpture of Usher that was done by Daniel Arsham. The cracks and erosions in the sculpture represent flaws and that things and people are not always as perfect or beautiful as they appear on the outside, relating to some of the themes in the album.

Promotion 
On August 26, 2016, Usher released the instant-grats from these tracks such as "Missin U" and "Champions" with the latter to be featured on the upcoming boxing film Hands of Stone, where Usher portrays Sugar Ray Leonard. On September 2, 2016, Usher appeared on the BBC Radio 1, Live Lounge, where he performed "No Limit" and "Crash" as well as singles from his previous albums. Usher performed "Crash" on The Tonight Show with Jimmy Fallon and The Ellen Show. Usher held multiple private listening sessions for Hard II Love. On September 13, 2016, Usher had an exclusive playback listening session put on by Tidal held at the Ace Theatre in Los Angeles, California. Radio host Big Boy led the intimate session, where Usher talked about the new album track-by-track. On September 16, 2016, the evening of his album release, Usher hosted and performed songs from the album at his private listening party hosted by iHeartRadio and AT&T Live at Pier 15 in New York City.

Singles 
On June 9, 2016, Usher released the album's first single, titled "No Limit" to the music streaming platform Tidal. The song features guest rap verse from an American rapper Young Thug, with production by B. A. M. and Rock City. Usher performed it at the BET Experience and first live televised performance of the song at 2016's BET Awards, which took place at the Microsoft Theater in Los Angeles, California on June 26, 2016. The song peaked at number 32 on the US Billboard Hot 100, number 9 on the US Hot R&B/Hip-Hop Songs, and at number 4 on the rhythmic charts.

The album's second single, titled "Crash" was released for all digital platforms on June 10, 2016. Its music video was uploaded to Vevo on June 16, 2016. The song was produced by f a l l e n, and Carlos St. John.

On August 26, 2016, "Missin U" was released for online streaming and digital download, along with "Champions". The former was produced by Pop Wansel and Autoro Whitfield. "Missin U" impacted US urban adult contemporary radio as the album's third single on September 13, 2016.

On August 30, 2016, Usher released "Rivals" and its accompanying music video on Tidal. The song features guest rap verse from an Atlanta-native and fellow American hip hop recording artist Future, with production by K-Major and Murphy Kid. "Rivals" impacted US urban adult contemporary radio as the album's fourth single on September 13, 2016.

Critical reception 

Hard II Love received generally positive reviews from critics. At Metacritic, which assigns a normalized rating out of 100 to reviews from mainstream publications, the album received an average score of 74, based on 8 reviews. Maura Johnston of Rolling Stone expresses that Hard II Love, "stretches the boundaries of R&B while winding toward the brooding atmospherics that have enveloped much of pop over the past 12 months." Chris DeVille of Stereogum wore that the album "suggests Usher will continue to make hits, headline arenas, and be one of the world's most beloved musical superstars. The guy's natural singing prowess and effortless ability to jump across genre make him a national treasure. In just about every context, he sounds like a pro."

John Pareles of The New York Times commented "he has all the gifts and skills he needs, starting with a genuinely expressive voice that encompasses an ardent croon, a melting falsetto and quick, singsong declamation that puts him at the border of rapping. Told Wright from Vulture wrote "the album is a true return to form for the R&B artist, complete with falsetto crooning and sexy bed-thumping beats". Ira Madison III from MTV wrote that "sexy bangers like 'Bump,' 'Tell Me,' and 'Make U a Believer', helps Usher meets his goals and then some on Hard II Love after seeing few years 'experimenting' with music, he told us, now he's ready to release a classic R&B album again". John Reyes of Idolator wrote Hard II Love is impressive because it shows an R&B vet who's been around for two decades and has sold 43 million albums worldwide. Clover Hope of Jezebel complimented Usher's vocals, saying that "his seamless melodies and fluid vocal strokes remain leaps and bounds ahead of his peers". AllMusic's Andy Kellman felt that Hard II Love "is the most pleasing Usher album in over a decade. In terms of ability, agility, and creativity, Usher's vocals still crush the commercial competition."

Commercial performance 
In his home country of United States, Hard II Love debuted at number five on the US Billboard 200, earning 38,000 album-equivalent units (including 28,000 copies as pure album sales) in its first week. This became Usher's eighth US top-ten album. The album was also streamed 10.7 million times on Tidal in the first week.

Track listing 

Sample credits
"Missin U" contains a sample of "Third World Man" performed by Steely Dan, written by Walter Becker and Donald Fagen.
"Bump" contains a sample of "I Wanna Rock" performed by Luke, written by Luther Campbell.
"Let Me" contains a sample of "Love You Down" performed by Ready for the World, written by Melvin C. Riley.

Personnel 
Credits for Hard II Love adapted from AllMusic.

Managerial

Usher Raymond IV – executive producer
Mark Pitts – executive producer, A&R
Jaha Johnson – co-executive producer
Coup D'état – co-executive producer
Keith Thomas – A&R consultant, vocal producer
Leticia Hillard – A&R consultant
Randy Warnken – assistant 
Jason Stanulis – assistant 

Riley McIntyre – assistant 
Jeff Jackson – assistant 
Brandon Harding – assistant 
Nicholas Essig – assistant 
Jacob Dennis – assistant 
Maddox Chhim – assistant 
Jeremy Brown – assistant 
Calvin Bailiff – assistant 

Nico Raat – Security director

Visuals and imagery

Daniel Arsham – art direction, sculpture 
Steve Ramirez – design

James Law – photography
D.L. Warfield – album and song title illustration 

Performance credits

Usher Raymond IV – primary artist
Young Thug – featured artist
Future – featured artist
Rubén Blades – featured artist

Priyanka Chopra – vocals
Lil Jon – vocals
Uncle Luke – vocals

Production

Dernst Emile II – producer
Metro Boomin – producer
PartyNextDoor – producer
 Brandon "B.A.M." Hodge – producer
Pop & Oak – producer
R!O – producer
Kamo – producer
Tre Drumz – producer
Carlos St. John – producer
f a l l e n – producer
Fisticuffs – producer
Geniuz League – producer
xSDTRK – producer
K-Major – producer
Raphael Saadiq –  producer
Mario Jefferson –  producer 
David "Prep" Hughes –  producer
Joseph Hill –  producer
Track King Cole –  producer
Yonatan "xSDTRK" Ayal –  producer, programming
Paul Epworth –  producer, programming
Taura Stinson –  vocal arrangement
Kory Aaron – engineer, vocal engineer 
Matt Wiggins – engineer
Sam Thomas – engineer
John "J-Banga" Kercy – engineer
Joseph Hartwell Jones – engineer
Seth Firkins – engineer 
Jeff Edwards – engineer 
Donnie Meadows – production coordination
Manny Marroquin – mixing
Tom Coyne – mastering

Charts

Weekly charts

Year-end charts

See also 
 2016 in hip hop music
 List of UK R&B Albums Chart number ones of 2016
 List of Billboard number-one R&B albums of 2016
 PBR&B

References 

2016 albums
Usher (musician) albums
Albums produced by Rock City
Albums produced by Metro Boomin
Albums produced by Raphael Saadiq
Albums produced by Oak Felder
RCA Records albums
Albums produced by PartyNextDoor
Albums produced by Paul Epworth
Albums produced by Tricky Stewart
Albums produced by Frank Dukes
Albums produced by The-Dream